The Ministry of Post and Telecommunications is a government ministry in North Korea which is responsible for the North Korean postal service, telephone system, and media such as television and print press. Additionally, the ministry is responsible for mint stamps. In 2010, the ministry participated in a cyber-attack on South Korea using an IP address leased from China.  The ministry is a member of the Asia-Pacific Telecommunity.

The current minister is Kim Kwang-chol. He was preceded by Sim Chol-ho, who was appointed to the post in February 2012. Sim was reported executed in a February 2016 article.

Former ministers
Kim Jong-ju: September 2, 1948 ~   ? 
Pak Il-u: March 1953 - November 28, 1955
Chang-Hum Kim: November 29, 1955 ~ September 19, 1957 
Jun jun Ko September 20, 1957 ~ April 24, 1958 Choi Hyun April 24, 1958 ~ October 22, 1962 
Park Young-soon October 23, 1962 ~ December 16, 1967 Park Young-soon December 16, 1967 ~ December 27, 1967 
Kim Young-chae December 15, 1977-1980 Kim Young-chae 1980 ~ April 4, 1982, April 5, 1982 ~ December 28, 1986, December 29, 1986 ~ 
Changho Kim May 24, 1990 ~ 
Blind hag Lee Geum-bum September 5, 2000 ~ 2002 
Lee Geum-beom 2002 ~ September 2, 2003, September 3, 2003 ~ July 2005 
Ryu Yong-sop (2005 英 燮) July 2005 ~ January 2009 
Sim Chol-ho: February 2012 ~ 2015 
Kim Kwang-chol: 2015 ~ Present

See also
Cabinet of North Korea
North Korean postal service
Telecommunications in North Korea

References

Cabinet of North Korea